"We Got Love" is a song by American singer-songwriter Teyana Taylor released as a single on December 6, 2019. A version featuring Lauryn Hill was released on March 13, 2020.

Background
"We Got Love" was originally intended for Taylor's second studio album K.T.S.E.. The track leaked online in June 2018 with a spoken word outro performed by Lauryn Hill. "We Got Love" was later intended to be included on Kanye West's ninth studio album Yandhi. Taylor and West performed the song as a duet during the season 44 premiere of Saturday Night Live to promote Yandhi; the album failed to ever be released. West and Taylor then recorded a music video for "We Got Love" in the TMZ parking lot, but the music video was never released.

On December 5, 2019, Taylor announced through Instagram that "We Got Love" would be released on streaming services at midnight.

Personnel
Credits adapted from Tidal
 Kanye West – production
 BoogzDaBeast – co-production
 E. Vax – co-production
 Mike Dean – production
 Johan Lenox – additional production, string arrangement, programming
 Seven Aurelius – production, keyboards
 Yasmeen Al-Mazeedi – violin

Charts

References

2019 singles
Teyana Taylor songs
Lauryn Hill songs
Song recordings produced by Kanye West
Song articles with missing songwriters